Alexander Brown Nevin (October 3, 1850 – October 10, 1921) was a 19th-century Major League Baseball player.

Sources

1850 births
1921 deaths
Baseball players from Pennsylvania
Major League Baseball third basemen
Elizabeth Resolutes players
19th-century baseball players